Ebaeides grouvellei is a species of beetle in the family Cerambycidae. It was described by Belon in 1891.

References

Ebaeides
Beetles described in 1891